

Touring party
 Manager: Brian O'Brien
 Coach: Eddie O'Sullivan
 Assistant coach: Declan Kidney
 Captain:  Keith Wood

Backs

Forwards

The matches

New Zealand: 15.Leon MacDonald, 14.Doug Howlett, 13.Tana Umaga, 12.Aaron Mauger, 11.Caleb Ralph, 10.Andrew Mehrtens, 9.Justin Marshall, 8.Scott Robertson, 7.Richie McCaw, 6.Reuben Thorne (capt.), 5.Norm Maxwell, 4.Chris Jack, 3.Greg Somerville, 2.Mark Hammett, 1.Dave Hewett, – replacements: Daryl Gibson, Joe McDonnell, Jonah Lomu – No entry : Tom Willis, Taine Randell, Marty Holah, Byron Kelleher

Ireland: 15.Girvan Dempsey, 14.Geordan Murphy, 13.Brian O'Driscoll, 12.John Kelly, 11.Justin Bishop, 10.Ronan O'Gara, 9.Peter Stringer, 8.Anthony Foley, 7.Keith Gleeson, 6.Simon Easterby, 5.Paul O'Connell, 4.Gary Longwell, 3.John Hayes, 2.Keith Wood (capt.), 1.Reggie Corrigan, – replacements: Malcolm O'Kelly, David Humphreys – No entry: Shane Byrne, Paul Wallace, Alan Quinlan, Guy Easterby, Mel Deane

New Zealand: 15.Leon MacDonald, 14.Jonah Lomu, 13.Mark Robinson, 12.Aaron Mauger, 11.Caleb Ralph, 10.Andrew Mehrtens, 9.Justin Marshall, 8.Scott Robertson, 7.Richie McCaw, 6.Reuben Thorne (capt.), 5.Norm Maxwell, 4.Chris Jack, 3.Greg Somerville, 2.Mark Hammett, 1.Dave Hewett, – replacements: 17.Joe McDonnell, 18.Simon Maling, 19.Marty Holah, 20.Byron Kelleher, 21.Daryl Gibson, 22.Doug Howlett – No entry : Tom Willis

Ireland: 15.Girvan Dempsey, 14.Geordan Murphy, 13.Brian O'Driscoll, 12.John Kelly, 11.Justin Bishop, 10.Ronan O'Gara, 9.Peter Stringer, 8.Anthony Foley, 7.Keith Gleeson, 6.Simon Easterby, 5.Malcolm O'Kelly, 4.Gary Longwell, 3.John Hayes, 2.Keith Wood (capt.), 1.Reggie Corrigan, – replacements: 16.Shane Byrne, 17.Paul Wallace, 18.Leo Cullen, 19.Alan Quinlan , 21.David Humphreys – No entry: 20.Guy Easterby, 22.Mel Deane

See also
 History of rugby union matches between All Blacks and Ireland

References

2002
2002 in New Zealand rugby union
Tour
2002 rugby union tours